Age of Consent is the fourth full-length album by the American heavy metal band Virgin Steele. The album took eight months to complete, a change from Noble Savage which was recorded in only a few weeks, and was finally released in October 1988. It received scarce promotion and distribution by their small label, resulting in very low sales. The songs of this album follow in style and content the music of the previous album Noble Savage, adding a more polished sound and production. At the time of release, the band faced legal and financial setbacks that brought to the unofficial disbandment of Virgin Steele. Joe O'Reilly, although credited for playing bass on the album, was ill at the time of recording and was ghosted by DeFeis and Pursino.

The album was reissued on CD in 1997 by Noise Records, with a new song listing, a new cover and many bonus tracks. In November 2011 Age of Consent was once again reissued by Steamhammer Records, a subsidiary of SPV, with the same track list as the 1997 release, but with an added bonus CD (named Under the Graveyard Moon) containing 7 additional tracks.

Track listing 
All lyrics by David DeFeis except "Stay on Top", "Desert Plains", "Screaming for Vengeance", "Breach of Lease", and "Down by the River"

Personnel

Band members 
 David DeFeis – vocals, keyboards, producer
 Ed Pursino – all guitars, bass
 Joe O'Reilly – bass
 Joey Ayvazian – drums

Production 
 Chris Bubacz – producer, engineer
 Al Falcon – engineer
 Doug Rose – assistant engineer
 Zoran Busic – executive producer

References 

1988 albums
Virgin Steele albums